Trawut Potieng (born 27 April 1991) is a Thai badminton player. He won the 2014 Smiling Fish International tournament in the men's doubles event partnered with Watchara Buranakruea.

Achievements

BWF International Challenge/Series 
Men's doubles

  BWF International Challenge tournament
  BWF International Series tournament

References

External links 
 

1991 births
Living people
Trawut Potieng
Competitors at the 2017 Southeast Asian Games
Trawut Potieng
Southeast Asian Games medalists in badminton
Trawut Potieng